Aiguille Peak is a peak located on the Canadian provincial boundary of Alberta and British Columbia in Banff National Park. It was named in 1915 by Arthur O. Wheeler. "Aiguille" is French for "needle" and is also a mountaineering term for a sharp-ridged summit.


Geology
Aiguille Peak is composed of sedimentary rock laid down during the Precambrian to Jurassic periods. Formed in shallow seas, this sedimentary rock was pushed east and over the top of younger rock during the Laramide orogeny.

Climate
Based on the Köppen climate classification, Aiguille Peak is located in a subarctic climate zone with cold, snowy winters, and mild summers. Temperatures can drop below −20 °C with wind chill factors below −30 °C. Precipitation runoff from the peak drains east to the Mistaya River, or west into tributaries of the Blaeberry River.

See also
List of peaks on the British Columbia–Alberta border

References

External links
 Aiguille Peak close-up photo: Flickr

Mountains of Banff National Park
Two-thousanders of Alberta
Two-thousanders of British Columbia